Joon-ho, also spelled Jun-ho, is a Korean given name, that is a masculine name. The meaning differs based on the hanja used to write the name. There are 34 hanja with the reading "joon" and 49 hanja with the reading "ho" on the South Korean government's official list of hanja which may be used in given names. Joon-ho was a popular name for baby boys in South Korea for several decades, coming in sixth place in 1970, rising to fourth place in 1980, and falling to seventh place in 1990.

People with this name include:

Entertainers
Heo Joon-ho (born 1964), South Korean actor
Bong Joon-ho (born 1969), South Korean film director 
Jung Joon-ho (born 1970), South Korean actor
Kim Joon-ho (comedian) (born 1975), South Korean comedian and actor
Son Jun-ho (actor) (born 1983), South Korean actor
Kim Junho (born 1986), stage name Juno (singer), South Korean singer 
Lee Jun-ho (singer) (born 1990), South Korean pop singer, member of boy band 2PM
Sportspeople
Kang Joon-ho (1928–1990), South Korean boxer
Lee Joon-ho (speed skater) (born 1965), South Korean short track speed skater
Jeon Jun-ho (born 1969), South Korean baseball outfielder (Korea Baseball Organization)
Kang Chun-ho (born 1971), South Korean football defender
Cho Jun-ho (footballer) (born 1973), South Korean football goalkeeper
Cho Jun-ho (judoka) (born 1988), South Korean judo practitioner
Lee Jun-ho (footballer) (born 1989), South Korean football full back
Son Jun-ho (footballer) (born 1992), South Korean football midfielder
Hong Joon-ho (born 1993), South Korean football centre back
Hwang Jun-ho (skier) (born 1993), South Korean cross-country skier
Kim Jun-ho (speed skater) (born 1995), South Korean speed skater

Others
Kenneth Bae (born 1968 as Pae Jun-ho), South Korean-born American missionary imprisoned by North Korea
Jeon Joonho (born 1969), South Korean artist

See also
List of Korean given names

References

Korean masculine given names